Empires of Eden is a collaborative power metal recording project conceived and overseen by guitarist Stu Marshall, celebrated for his work with Dungeon and Paindivision. Orchestrated from Sydney, Australia, Empires of Eden is characterized by complex musical arrangements and the involvement of guest musicians from all around the world.

History

Origins and proof of concept (2007–2008)
Paving the way for Empires of Eden's collaborative ethos, Marshall was heavily involved in the writing of Dungeon's 2004 album One Step Beyond. The album was one of the band's most celebrated releases and remains Dungeon's flagship album released in the US. Inspired by the synergistic production of the album, and its warm reception, Marshall began evaluating the viability of a framework for an international recording project in the tradition of Ayreon or Avantasia.

According to Marshall, the project title was inspired by the duality of yearning for the unattainable and finding a way to achieve it regardless: “In the Western world, the 21st century’s dreams and temptations mean we are continually walking around in a state of believing the unattainable is just around the corner. We live in a digitalized pseudo-Eden, a worldwide collection of empires driven by greed posing as free will. At the same time, the name is a reference to the people who participate in this project. Thanks to our passion for music, we have built an empire of our own where artistic integrity represents a pure garden in which the musicians are free to follow their inspiration without being constrained by day-to-day issues such as the quest for the dollar.”

Songs of War and Vengeance (2009)
Marshall approached a number of vocalists and other musicians with the premise that they were to be responsible for their own lyrics and melodies within a composition tailored to their typical style and range. This targeted approach yielded a highly non-standard power metal album incorporating features such as an orchestral bonus track and spoken-word components, with Marshall’s compositional style maintaining a sense of consistency throughout. The album was recorded at Marshall’s Frontiers Studio in Sydney and featured the talents of Louie Gorgievski (Crimsonfire), Mike Zoias (Transcending Mortality) and Chris Ninni (Sydney session vocalist) among others.

While the majority of soloing on the album was penned by Marshall, there are also standout performances by guests including 'Lord' Tim Grose and Mark Furtner (Lord), Ben Thomas (Paindivision) Richie Hausberger (Project Doomsday), Chris Porcianko Vanishing Point (band), Yoshiyasu Maruyama (Argument Soul) and Akira Takada (Cerberus).

Reborn in Fire (2010)
With considerable critical acclaim and industry interest, the second release from Empires of Eden was a more ambitious vehicle. Marshall approached singers who had been major influences on his musical style, and the resulting compositions were specifically nuanced to highlight each contributor's strengths. Upon release, Reborn in Fire garnered consistently high (9+/10) ratings from music critics worldwide and included the work of Zak Stevens, Michael Vescera, Steve Grimmett and Sean Peck as well as returning guest vocalists.

The album is notable for 30-piece orchestral arrangements and an uncompromising approach to production, reminiscent of concept recordings such as Operation: Mindcrime by Queensrÿche and symphonic metal acts such as Therion and Within Temptation that include a strong component of classical orchestration.

In 2011 the band signed a management deal with Rock N Growl Records.

Members
 Songs of War and Vengeance (2009)
 Stu Marshall – guitar, bass, orchestral arrangement, drum programming, engineering
 Louie Gorgievski – vocals
 Chris Ninni – vocals
 Mike Zoias – vocals
 Dan Quinlan  – co-engineering, production
 'Lord' Tim Grose – guest solo appearance (guitar)
 Mark Furtner – guest solo appearance (guitar)
 Akira Takada – guest solo appearance (guitar)
 Gun Arvidssen – spoken word
 Yoshiyasu Maruyama – guest solo appearance (guitar)
 Richie Hausberger – guest solo appearance (guitar)
 Ben Thomas – guest solo appearance (guitar)
 Chris Porcianko – guest solo appearance (guitar)

 Reborn in Fire (2010)
 Stu Marshall – guitar, bass, orchestral arrangement, drum programming, engineering
 Louie Gorgievski – vocals
 Chris Ninni – vocals
 Mike Zoias – vocals
 Dan Quinlan  – co-engineering, production
 Zak Stevens – vocals
 Michael Vescera – vocals
 Steve Grimmett – vocals
 Sean Peck – vocals
 Carlos Zema – vocals
 Jason "Jasix" Manewell – drums
 Bobby Williamson – guest solo appearance (keyboard)

Discography
Songs of War and Vengeance (2009)
Reborn in Fire (2010)
Channelling the Infinite (2012)
Architect of Hope (2015)

References

External links
 Empires of Eden at MySpace
 www.empiresofeden.com

Musical groups established in 2008
Musical groups from Sydney
Australian power metal musical groups